Guys with Kids is an American sitcom television series that aired on NBC, from September 11, 2012, to February 27, 2013, as part of the 2012–13 television schedule. The series was created by Jimmy Fallon and Charlie Grandy and starred Anthony Anderson, Jesse Bradford, Zach Cregger, Jamie-Lynn Sigler, Erinn Hayes, and Tempestt Bledsoe.  The series chronicles the lives of three friends, and their respective partners, as they raise their children in a modern environment.

Guys with Kids also aired on Global as part of the  2012–13 Canadian network television schedule.
Guys with Kids also aired on Comedy Central India.

Cast

Main cast
 Anthony Anderson as Gary, father of Yoda, Clark, and twin boys, Robbie and GJ (Gary Jr.). 
 Jesse Bradford as Chris Campbell, father to Ernie
 Zach Cregger as Nick Theyer, father to Violet and Freddie
 Tempestt Bledsoe as Marny, wife of Gary 
 Erinn Hayes as Sheila, divorced from Chris 
 Jamie-Lynn Sigler as Emily Theyer, wife of Nick

Children
 Brian Mganga as Clark
 Marleik Walker II as Yoda
 Mykayla Sohn as Violet

Recurring cast
Cast members appearing in at least two episodes include:

 Brian Posehn as Victor, the apartment building's maintenance man
 Kareem Abdul-Jabbar as himself
 Fiona Gubelmann as Sage, Chris's girlfriend prior to his relationship with Shelia
 Mark Consuelos as Andy, Ernie's nanny

Development and production
NBC placed a 13-episode order in May 2012.

It was announced in June 2012 that Sara Rue, who portrayed Sheila in the original pilot, would be replaced by Erinn Hayes, a change necessitated when ABC decided to pick up the comedy Malibu Country, which also starred Rue.

The series ran from September 12, 2012, to February 27, 2013. The series aired in Canada on Global, premiering one day early, on September 11, 2012.

On November 15, 2012, NBC announced it has ordered four more episodes, bringing the series to a total of 17 episodes.

On May 9, 2013, NBC canceled the series after one season.

Episodes

Reception

Critical response
Guys With Kids received generally negative reviews from critics. On Metacritic, the show received a score of 38 out of 100, from 25 reviews, indicating "generally unfavorable reviews". Rotten Tomatoes rated season 1 as 7% based on reviews from 28 critics, with the critical consensus: "Worthless and abysmal, Guys with Kids is pitiful in its lack of humor and plot."

Glenn Garvin of the Miami Herald was only one of a few who gave a positive review, saying "Guys With Kids is a perfect confection of witty dialogue and slapstick action." Matt Zoller Seitz of New York Magazine stated "I expected to hate Guys With Kids... My animosity faded after about five minutes, when it became clear that the show wasn't terribly interested in the kids." Diane Wertz of Newsday gave it a D and stated "Nothing to see here. Move on." Matt Rouse of TV Guide wrote, "The season's most depressingly generic and retro sitcom, so squishy and lacking in edge it might as well been written in nerf".

Accolades
On December 11, 2012, Anthony Anderson was nominated for an NAACP Image Award, as Outstanding Actor in a Comedy Series. The award went to Don Cheadle for his work on Showtime's House of Lies.

See also
 House Husbands, a 2012 Australian television comedy with a similar premise

References

External links
 
 Guys With Kids at Global Television Network
 

2010s American sitcoms
2012 American television series debuts
2013 American television series endings
Jimmy Fallon
English-language television shows
NBC original programming
Television series by Universal Television
Television shows set in New York City
Parenting television series